Mike Kearney (born 18 February 1953) is a retired Scottish professional football player who played as a forward in the Football League for Shrewsbury Town, Chester and Reading.

References

1953 births
Living people
Footballers from Glasgow
Association football forwards
Scottish footballers
Petershill F.C. players
Shrewsbury Town F.C. players
Chester City F.C. players
Reading F.C. players
Basingstoke Town F.C. players
English Football League players
Scottish Junior Football Association players